Loamaro  — the name of the inhabitants of the mountains in Chechnya and Ingushetia. Loamaro consists of loam (mountain) and the suffix -(a)ro. The ethnonym is literally translated from the Ingush and Chechen language as "mountaineer".

History 
The first report of the ethnonym in historical documents was in 1793 by Peter Simon Pallas.

Toponymy 
According to Professor B. Alborov, the name of the village Lamardon in the Prigorodny District is associated with one of the ethnonyms of the Ingush who once lived there:

See also 
 Ghalghaï
 Gligvi
 Kalkans

References

Bibliography 
 
 
 
 
 
 
 
 
 
 

History of Ingushetia
Ethnonyms
Ethnonyms of the Ingush